Dhanwaan is a 1993 Indian Hindi-language romance film directed by K. Vishwanath. It stars Ajay Devgan, Manisha Koirala, Karishma Kapoor, Avinash Wadhavan in lead roles.

Plot 
Kashinath and Imli are childhood sweethearts and everyone expects them to marry. Then comes rich, wealthy, and sickly Anjali Chopra into Kashinath's life, and then everything changes. Anjali gives up on her sickliness and becomes bold, thanks to Kashinath's care. Anjali falls in love with Kashinath, and boldly tells her dad, Manmohan Chopra, that she will only marry Kashinath. But he wants her to wed Ajit. Imli reveals her secret that she has heart disease, and if not treated, she will die. Kashinath, unaware of Anjali's affections must find the money to save his true love. What sacrifices will he have to make in order to achieve this?

Cast
Ajay Devgan as Kashinath
Manisha Koirala as Imli
Karishma Kapoor as Anjali Chopra
Avinash Wadhawan as Ajit
Aruna Irani as Kashinath's Mother
Shakti Kapoor as Banarasi
Kader Khan as Jagmohan Chopra
Dalip Tahil as Manmohan Chopra
Tinu Anand as Ajit's Uncle
Himani Shivpuri as Hameed's Daughter
Shail Chaturvedi as Hameed

Soundtrack
The soundtrack was tuned by Anand–Milind.

References

External links
 
 "Dhanwaan Cast & Crew." indiafm.

1993 films
1990s Hindi-language films
1990s romance films
Films directed by K. Viswanath
Films scored by Anand–Milind
Indian romance films
Hindi-language romance films